Lamour may refer to:

Surname 
 Dorothy Lamour (1914–1996), American film actress
 Jean-François Lamour (born 1956), French politician and former fencer
 Marguerite Lamour (born 1956), French politician
 Pascal Lamour (born 1958), French Breton musician

Given name 
 Lamour Desrances, Haitian revolutionary leader

See also 
 L'Amour (disambiguation)
 Larmor (disambiguation)